Turves Green Boys' School is a secondary school in the West Heath area of Birmingham, England. It is approximately 80 years old. The school is an all-boys school with Technology College and Humanities College status. It received Technology College status in 1995. Approximately one fifth of pupils are on the special needs register. The 2007 OFSTED inspection noted that a very small proportion of pupils were of ethnic minorities. In 1994, 5% of the pupils in the school were of an ethnic minority.

The OFSTED inspection report of 2019 rated the school as ‘Inadequate’ and placed the school in special measures. The Board of Governors was dismissed in February 2020 and an Interim Executive Board was installed with view to preparing the school for academisation. The Chair of the Interim Executive Board was Chris Atkins. The school converted to academy status in May 2021. The school is now part of the Matrix Academy Trust. The trust decided to keep the former name of the school and installed Mr James Till as the new Headteacher. The Trust has track record of improving failing schools and has 5 secondary schools within the West Midlands area. As a new academy the school is yet to be inspected by OFSTED and therefore has no official judgment.

The 1960s chart topping band The Rockin' Berries first formed while several members were pupils at Turves Green Boys School.

Spencer Jukes, the guitarist for the band Mini Milk and the Kraves, was a pupil at Turves Green Boys School, as was BBC journalist Lewis Goodall.

See also
Turves Green
King Edward VI Northfield School for Girls (formerly Turves Green Girls' School)

References

External links
Turves Green Boys' Technology and Humanities College website
BBC School League table results for Turves Green Boys' School
Turves Green Boys' School subreddit

Boys' schools in the West Midlands (county)
Educational institutions established in 1939
1939 establishments in England
Academies in Birmingham, West Midlands
Secondary schools in Birmingham, West Midlands